Underground art is any form of art that operates outside of conventional norms in the art world, part of underground culture. This can include essentially any genre of art that is not popular in the art world, including visionary art and street art. Underground art can include art created both legally and illegally, organized or unauthorized, and can essentially exist in any form.

Visionary Art is often considered a form of underground art because of it popularity outside conventional art channels. Rather than being displayed in galleries and museums, most visionary art is displayed online, at music festivals, or other forms of gatherings such as Burning Man and Rainbow Gatherings.

Street Art is also often considered a form of underground art because of its unconventional settings. Again, rather than galleries and museums, street art exists in outdoors spaces, utilizing stickers, Lock On sculptures, installations, stencils, and/or spray paint as its medium.

Graffiti, a form of street art, typically refers to illegal forms of street art. Public response to graffiti is not always favorable and is often negative. Others say that unauthorized art comes from a desire to spread beauty and make cityscapes more interesting by painting over blank or barren walls.

A controversial point is whether or not these types of art should be taught in a formal setting. Guerrilla art falls under that umbrella of thought.  It is understood, that these acts mostly happen on public property.

See also
 Underground film
 Underground music
 Underground press

References

Further reading
 Gavin, Francesca (2007), Street Renegades: New Underground Art, Laurence King Publishers, 
 Brus, Gunter and Bianchi, Paolo (2001), Theo Altenberg Theo: The Paradise Experiment - The Utopia of Free Sexuality - Friedrichshof Commune 1973–8,  Triton Verlag Publishers, Austria, 
 Tzara, Tristan (1916 to 1922), Dada Volumes l and ll, Tristan Tzara Centre du XXe siècle,  and

External links
 The Vienna Actionists resource page
 Classic underground book, commonly given to hospice patients in their final stages of life

Visual arts genres